In audio engineering, a fade is a gradual increase or decrease in the level of an audio signal. The term can also be used for film cinematography or theatre lighting in much the same way (see fade (filmmaking) and fade (lighting)).

A recorded song may be gradually reduced to silence at its end (fade-out), or may gradually increase from silence at the beginning (fade-in). Fading-out can serve as a recording solution for pieces of music that contain no obvious ending. Both fades and crossfades are very valuable since they allow the engineer to quickly and easily make sure that the beginning and the end of any audio is smooth, without any prominent glitches.  It is necessary that there is a clear section of silence prior to the audio. Fade-ins and -outs can also be used to change the characteristics of a sound, such as to soften the attack in vocals where very plosive (‘b’, ‘d’, and ‘p’) sounds occur. It can also be used to soften up the attack of the drum and/or percussion instruments. A crossfade can be manipulated through its rates and coefficients in order to create different styles of fading. Almost every fade is different; this means that the fade parameters must be adjusted according to the individual needs of the mix.

Professional turntablists and DJs in hip hop music use faders on a DJ mixer, notably the horizontal crossfader, in a rapid fashion while simultaneously manipulating two or more record players (or other sound sources) to create "scratching" and develop beats. Club DJs in house music and techno use DJ mixers, two or more sound sources (two record players, two iPods, etc.) along with a skill called beatmatching (aligning the beats and tempos of two records) to make seamless dance mixes for dancers at raves, nightclubs and dance parties.

Though relatively rare, songs can fade out then fade back in. Some examples of this are "Helter Skelter" and "Strawberry Fields Forever" by The Beatles, "Suspicious Minds" by Elvis Presley, "Shine On Brightly" by Procol Harum, "Sunday Bloody Sunday" by John Lennon and Yoko Ono, "That Joke Isn't Funny Anymore" by The Smiths, "Thank You" by Led Zeppelin, "In Every Dream Home A Heartache" by Roxy Music, "It's Only Money, Pt. 2" by Argent, "The Great Annihilator" by Swans,  "(Reprise) Sandblasted Skin" by Pantera, "Illumination Theory" and "At Wit's End" by Dream Theater, "Future" by Paramore, "Doomsday" by MF Doom, "Outro" by M83, "Cold Desert" by Kings of Leon, and "The Edge Of The World" by DragonForce.

History

Origins and early examples 
Possibly the earliest example of a fade-out ending can be heard in Joseph Haydn's Symphony No. 45, nicknamed the "Farewell" Symphony on account of the fade-out ending. The symphony which was written in 1772 used this device as a way of courteously asking Haydn's patron Prince Nikolaus Esterházy, to whom the symphony was dedicated, to allow the musicians to return home after a longer than expected stay. This was expressed by the players extinguishing their stand candles and leaving the stage one by one during the final adagio movement of the symphony, leaving only two muted violins playing. Esterházy appears to have understood the message, allowing the musicians to leave.

Gustav Holst's "Neptune, the mystic", part of the orchestral suite The Planets written between 1914 and 1916, is another early example of music having a fade-out ending during performance. Holst stipulates that the women's choruses are "to be placed in an adjoining room, the door of which is to be left open until the last bar of the piece, when it is to be slowly and silently closed", and that the final bar (scored for choruses alone) is "to be repeated until the sound is lost in the distance". Although commonplace today, the effect bewitched audiences in the era before widespread recorded sound—after the initial 1918 run-through, Holst's daughter Imogen (in addition to watching the charwomen dancing in the aisles during "Jupiter") remarked that the ending was "unforgettable, with its hidden chorus of women's voices growing fainter and fainter ... until the imagination knew no difference between sound and silence".

The technique of ending a spoken or musical recording by fading out the sound goes back to the earliest days of recording. In the era of mechanical (pre-electrical) recording, this could only be achieved by either moving the sound source away from the recording horn, or by gradually reducing the volume at which the performer/s were singing, playing or speaking. With the advent of electrical recording, smooth and controllable fadeout effects could be easily achieved by simply reducing the input volume from the microphones using the fader on the mixing desk. The first experimental study on the effect of a fade-out showed that a version of a musical piece with fade-out in comparison to the same piece with a cold end prolonged the perceived duration by 2.4 seconds. This is called the “Pulse Continuity Phenomenon" and was measured by a tapping-along task to measure participants’ perception of pulsation.

An 1894 78 rpm record called "The Spirit of '76" features a narrated musical vignette with martial fife-and-drum that gets louder as it 'nears' the listener, and quieter as it 'moves away'. There are early examples that appear to bear no obvious relationship to movement. One is "Barkin' Dog" (1919) by the Ted Lewis Jazz Band. Another contender is "America" (1918), a patriotic piece by the chorus of evangelist Billy Sunday. By the early 1930s longer songs were being put on both sides of records, with the piece fading out at the end of Side One and fading back in at the beginning of Side Two. Records at the time held only about two to five minutes of music per side. The segue allowed for longer songs (such as Count Basie's "Miss Thing"), symphonies and live concert recordings.

However, shorter songs continued to use the fade-out for unclear reasons—for example, Fred Astaire's movie theme "Flying Down to Rio" (1933). Even using fade-out as a segue device does not seem obvious, though we certainly take it for granted today. It is possible that movies were an influence here. Fade-ins and fade-outs are often used as cinematic devices that begin and end scenes; film language that developed at the same time as these early recordings. The term 'fade-out' itself is of cinematic origin, appearing in print around 1918. And jazz, a favorite of early records, was a popular subject of early movies too. The same could be said for radio productions. Within a single programme of a radio production, many different types of fade can be applied. When mixing from speech to music, there are a few ways that fade can be used. Here are three examples.

Types
Straight: the introduction has become a musical link between the music/speech that follows, additionally the first notes of the intro can be emphasized to make it ‘pop’ out more.
Cutting the introduction: Since the first word of the vocals has to follow promptly after the cue light, it could be used to move the recording onward.
Introduction under speech: The music is placed at the specified time on the cue, the level must be low in order for the vocals to be audible. Here the fade-up generally occurs just before the final words in order for the cue to be given. In stage productions the closing music is played from a predetermined time and fades up at the closing words in order to fit in exactly with the remaining program time.

Contemporary
No modern recording can be reliably identified as "the first" to use the technique. In 2003, on the (now-defunct) website Stupid Question, John Ruch listed the following recordings as possible contenders:

More recently: "At the meta-song level, the prevalence of pre-taped sequences (for shops, pubs, parties, concert intervals, aircraft headsets) emphasizes the importance of flow. The effect on radio pop programme form [is] a stress on continuity achieved through the use of fades, voice-over links, twin-turntable mixing and connecting jingles."

Fade 
A fade can be constructed so that the motion of the control (linear or rotary) from its start to end points affects the level of the signal in a different manner at different points in its travel. If there are no overlapping regions on the same track, regular fade (pre-fade / post-fade) should be used. A smooth fade is one that changes according to the logarithmic scale, as faders are logarithmic over much of their working range of 30-40 dB. If the engineer requires one region to gradually fade into another on the same track, a crossfade would be more suitable. If however the two regions are on different tracks, fade-ins and fade-outs will be applied. A fade-out can be accomplished without letting the sound's distance increase, however this is also something it can do.  The perceived distance increase can be attributed to a diminishing level of timbral detail, not the result of a decreasing dynamic level. A listener's interest can be withdrawn from a sound that is faded at the lower end since the ear accepts a more prompt rounding off. The fade-in can be used as a device that separates the listener from the scene.
An example of a mini fade out, of about a second or two, is a sustained bass note left to die down.

Shapes 
The shape of a regular fade and a crossfade can be shaped by an audio engineer. Shape implies that you can change the rate at which the level change occurs over the length of the fade. Different types of preset fades shapes include linear, logarithmic, exponential and S-curve.

Linear 

The simplest of fade curves is the linear curve and it is normally the default fade. It takes a straight line and introduces a curve. This curve represents an equal degree by which the gain increases or decreases during the length of the fade. A linear fade-in curve makes it sound as though the volume increases sharply at the beginning, and more gradually towards the end. The same principle applies on a fade-out where a gradual drop in volume can be perceived in the beginning, and the fade gets more abrupt towards the end. If in your audio there is a natural ambience or reverb present that one would like to reduce, the linear shape would be ideal because of the initial drop in perceived volume. When applied it shortens the ambience. Also if the music requires an accelerating effect, this linear curve can also be applied. This type of fade is not very natural sounding. The principle of a linear crossfade is: at the beginning of the fade the perceived volume drops more quickly, one can see at the halfway point (in the middle of the crossfade) that the perceived volume drops below 50%. This is a very noticeable drop in volume. Also if the control can move from position 0 to 100, and the percentage of the signal that is allowed to pass equals the position of the control (i.e. 25% of the signal is allowed to pass when the control is 25% of the physical distance from the 0 point to the 100 point). At the midpoint of the fade the effect of a linear crossfade is that both the sounds are below half of their maximum perceived volume; and as a result the sum of the two fades will be below the maximum level of either. This is not applicable when the two sounds are on different levels and the crossfade time is long enough. In turn if the crossfade is short (for example on a single note) the dip of the volume in the middle of the crossfade can be quite noticeable.

Logarithmic 

Another type of curve is called the logarithmic ratio (also known as "audio taper"), or an inverse-logarithmic ratio.  The log/audio-taper more closely matches human hearing, with finer control at lower levels, increasing dramatically past the 50% point. Importantly, the perceived volume of a sound has a logarithmic relationship with its level in decibels. A fade that works on a logarithmic scale would thus counteract the curve of a linear fade. In fade-ins the shape of the perceived volume curve looks like the level in decibels pulled towards the middle part of the line to the bottom right corner. The fade-out in turn looks like it has been pulled toward the bottom-left corner. A logarithmic fade takes a line that has already been curved and straightens it out [15]. The logarithmic fade sounds consistent and smooth since the perceived volume is increased over the whole duration of the fade. This makes this curve very handy for fading standard pieces of music. It is best used on a long fade-out since the fade has a perceived linear nature. Also a fade-out sounds very neutral when incorporated to parts of music with natural ambience. In crossfades this type of curve sounds very natural. When this curve is applied the perceived volume of the fade's midpoint is at about 50% of the maximum – when the two sections are summed the output volume is fairly constant.

Exponential 

The exponential curve shape is in many ways the precise opposite of the logarithmic curves. The fade-in works as follows: it increases in volume slowly and then it shoots up very quickly at the end of the fade. The fade-out drops very quickly (from the maximum volume) and then declines slowly again over the duration of the fade. Simply stated a linear fade could thus be seen as an exaggerated version of an exponential fade in terms of the apparent volume. Thus the impression that would be gathered from an exponential curve's fade would sound as though the sound was rapidly accelerating towards the listener. Natural ambience can also be repressed by using an exponential fade-out. A crossfade, in the exponential shape, will have a perceivable dip in the middle, which is very undesirable in music and vocals. This depends largely on the length of the crossfade, a long crossfade on ambient sounds can sound perfectly satisfactory (the dip can add a little breath to the music). Exponential crossfades (or a curve with a similar shape) have a smaller drop in the middle of the fade.

S-curve 

The S-curve shape is interesting since it has qualities that correlate with the previously mentioned curves. The level of the sound is 50% at the midpoint, but before and after the midpoint the shape is not linear. There are also two types of S-curves. Traditional S-curve fade-in has attributes of the exponential curve can be seen at the beginning; at the midpoint to the end it is more logarithmic in nature. A traditional S-curve fade-out: is logarithmic from the beginning up to the midpoint, then its attributes are based on the exponential curve from the midpoint to the end. This is true for the situation in reverse as well (for both fade-in and fade-out). Crossfading S-curves works as follows; it diminishes the amount of time that both sounds are playing simultaneously. This ensures that the edits sound like a direct cut when the two edits meet - this adds an extra smoothness to the edited regions.

The second type of S-curve is more apt for longer crossfades, since they are smooth and have the ability to have both of the crossfades in the overall level; so that they are audible for as long as possible. There is a short period at the start of each of the crossfades where the outgoing sound drops toward 50% quickly (with the incoming sound rising just as fast to 50%). This acceleration of sound slows and both sounds will appear as if they are at the same level for most of the crossfade (in the middle) before the changeover happens. 
DAW's gives one the ability to change the shape of logarithmic, exponential, and S-curve fades and crossfades. Changing the shape of a logarithmic fade will change how soon the sound will rise above 50%, and then how long it takes for the end of the fade-out to drop below 50% once again. With exponential fades the shape change will affect the shape in reverse, to the shape of the logarithmic fade. In the S-curve's traditional form the shape determines how quickly the change can occur and in the type 2 curve the change can determine the time it takes for both the sounds to get to a nearly equal level.

Fade times 
It is also possible to apply different fade times to the out and in portions; which a standard crossfade would not allow you to apply. Appropriate fade-in time for a linear fade can be around 500ms; for the fade-out 500ms would also be affective. By having this longer fade it makes sure that everything is gentle as it gives the fade time to blend in and be less abrupt. To clear up plosive sounds created through vocals a fade-in can be used, but now it has to have a very short time of around 10ms. The fade time can always be adjusted by the engineer in order to locate the best time. It is important that the fade does not change the intelligibility or character of the sound too much. When the crossfade is longer than 10ms the standard linear fades are not always the best choice for music editing.

Crossfading 

A crossfader on a DJ mixer essentially functions like two faders connected side-by-side, but in opposite directions. A crossfader is typically mounted horizontally, so that the DJ can slide the fader from the extreme left (this provides 100% of sound source A) to the extreme right (this provides 100% of sound source B), move the fader to the middle (this is a 50/50 mix of sources A and B), or adjust the fader to any point in between. It allows a DJ to fade one source out while fading another source in at the same time. This is extremely useful when beatmatching two sources of audio (or more, where channels can be mapped to one of the two sides of the crossfader individually) such as phonograph records, compact discs or digital sources. The technique of crossfading is also used in audio engineering as a mixing technique, particularly with instrumental solos. A mix engineer will often record two or more takes of a vocal or instrumental part and create a final version which is a composite of the best passages of these takes by crossfading between each track. In the perfect case, the crossfade would keep a constant output level, an important quality for a club DJ who is creating a seamless mix of dance tracks for dancers or a radio DJ seeking to avoid "dead air" (silence) between songs, an error that can cause listeners to change channels. However, there is no standard on how this should be achieved.

There are many software applications that feature virtual crossfades, for instance, burning-software for the recording of audio-CDs. Also many DAW's (Pro Tools, Logic exc.) have this function. Crossfade is normally found on samplers and usually based on velocity. The purpose of a cross-fade it to utilize a smooth changeover between two cut pieces of audio. Velocity crossfading can be incorporated through a MIDI  transformation device and where more than one note can be assigned to a given pad (note) on the MIDI keyboard; velocity crossfading may be available.

These types of crossfades (those that are based on note velocity) allow two (even more) samples to be assigned to one note or range of notes. This requires both a loud and soft sample; the reason for this is Timbre  change. This type of crossfade is quite subtle depending on the proportion of the received note velocity value of the loud and soft sample.

Crossfading usually involves the sounding of a combination of one or two sounds at the same time. While crossfading one does not want the second part of the fade to start playing before the first part is finished; one wants the overlapping parts to be as short as possible. If edit regions are not trimmed to a zero-crossing point one will get unwelcome pops in the middle. A sound at the lowest velocity can fade into a sound of a higher velocity, in the order of: first the first sound then the second. All possible without fading out the sounds that are already present. This in turn is a form of Layering  that can be used in the mix. The same effect (as was created with velocity) can be applied to a controller. This allows continued monitored control; the crossfading function can also be controlled on some instruments by the keyboard position. These sounds on the MIDI keyboard can be programmed.

A crossfade can either be used between two unrelated pieces of music or between two sounds that are similar; in both of these cases, one would like the sound to be one continuous sound without any bumps. When applying a crossfade between two very different pieces of music (relating to both tone and pitch), one could simply use a crossfade between the two pieces, make a few minor adjustments. This is because the two sounds are different from one another. In the case of a crossfade between two sounds, that are similar, phase-cancellation can become an issue. The two sounds that are crossfaded should be brought into comparison with one another. If both sounds are moving upward they will have a cumulative effect  - when added together, this is what one wants. What is not desirable is when both sounds are moving in a different direction, since this can lead to cancelations. This leads to no sound on areas where the amplitudes cancel out one another; there will thus be silence in the middle of the crossfade. This occurrence is rare though since the parameters have to be the same. Commonly a crossfade will result in a gradual reduction in the amount of the sample whose pitch is lower, and an increase will be found on the pitch that is higher. The longer a crossfade, the more likely a problem will occur. One also does not want the effect of the crossfade to be very prominent in the middle of the notes, since if different notes are between the edit point there will be a time when both of the sounds can be heard simultaneously. This overlapping is not expected from a normal singing voice, no reference to Overtone singing.

Crossfades can either be applied to a piece of music in real time, or it can be pre-calculated. 
Grandmaster Flash has been credited with the invention of the first crossfade by sourcing parts from a junkyard in the Bronx. It was initially an on/off toggle switch from an old microphone that he transformed into a left/right switch which allowed him to switch from one turntable to another, thereby avoiding a break in the music. However the earliest commercial documented example was designed by Richard Wadman, one of the founders of the British company Citronic. It was called the model SMP101, made about 1977, and had a crossfader that doubled as a L/R balance control or a crossfade between two inputs.

Crossfade shapes
When crossfading two signals that are being combined (mixed), the two fade curves can employ any of the shapes listed above (see #Shapes), such as linear, exponential, S-curve, etc. When the goal is to have the perceived loudness of the combined mix signal stay fairly constant across the full range of the mix, special shapes must be used, called "equal power" (or  "constant power") shapes. Equal power shapes are based on audio power principles, particularly the fact that the power of an audio signal is proportional to the square of the amplitude. Many equal power shapes have the property that the mid point of the mix provides an amplitude multiplier of 0.707 (square root of one half) for both signals. A variety of equal power shapes are available, and the optimal shape will generally depend on the amount of correlation between the two signals.
 
Equal power shapes typically have the sum of their curves (in the middle of the mix range) exceeding the nominal maximum amplitude (1.0), which may produce clipping in some contexts.  If that is a concern, then "equal gain" (or "constant gain") shapes should be used (which may be linear or curved) that are designed so the two curves always sum to 1.    

In the digital signal processing realm, the term "power curve" is often used to designate crossfade shapes, particularly for equal power shapes.

Fader 

A fader is any device used for fading, especially when it is a knob or button that slides along a track or slot. It is principally a variable resistance or potentiometer also called a ‘pot’. A contact can move from one end to another. As this movement takes place the resistance of the circuit can either increase or decrease. At one end the resistance of the scale is at 0 and at the other side it is infinite. A. Nisbett explains the fader law as follows in his book called The Sound studio:"The ‘law’ of the fader is near-logarithmic over much of its range, which means that a scale of decibels can be made linear (or close to it) over a working range of perhaps 60 dB. If the resistance were to increase according to the same law beyond this, it would be twice as long before reaching a point where the signal is negligible. But the range below -50 dB is of little practical use, so here the rate of fade increases rapidly to the final cut-off".

A knob which rotates is usually not considered a fader, although it is electrically and functionally equivalent. Some small mixers use knobs rather than faders, as do a small number of DJ mixers designed for club DJs who are creating seamless mixes of songs. A fader can be either analogue, directly controlling the resistance or impedance to the source (e.g. a potentiometer); or digital, numerically controlling a digital signal processor (DSP). Analogue faders are found on mixing consoles. A fader can also be used as a control for a voltage controlled amplifier, which has the same effect on the sound as any other fader, but the audio signal does not pass through the fader itself.

Digital 
Digital faders are also referred to as virtual faders, since they can be viewed on the screen of a digital audio workstation. Modern high end digital mixers often feature "flying faders", faders with piezo-electric actuators attached; such faders can be multi-use and will jump to the correct position for a selected function or saved setting. Flying faders can be automated, so that when a timecode is presented to the equipment, the fader will move according to a previously performed path. Also called an automated fader, as it recalls the movement of the channel faders in time. A full-function automation system will continuously scan the console, many times per second, in order to incorporate new settings. While this scan is in progress, the stored representation of the previous scan will be compared to that of the fader's current position. If the fader's position has changed, the new position will be identified, thus resulting in a spurt of data.

The console's computer will update the console's controls on playback. This will be done from memory at the same speed. The advantage of working with mix automation is that only one engineer can perform the job with minimal effort; it can be set up or recorded beforehand to make it even simpler. An example of this is when Ken Hamman installed linear faders that made it possible for him to alter several channels with one hand while mixing, thus he assumed an interactive role in the process of recording. This type of fader level adjustment is also called ‘riding’ the fader.

Types
Many DJ equipment manufacturers offer different mixers for different purposes, with different fader styles, e.g., "scratching", beatmixing, and cut mixing. High-priced mixers often have crossfade curve switches allowing the DJ to select the type of crossfade necessary. Experienced DJs are also able to crossfade between tracks using the channel faders.

Pre-fader, post-fader 

On a mixer with auxiliary send mixes, the send mixes are configured pre-fader or post-fader. If a send mix is configured pre-fader, then changes to the main channel strip fader does not affect the send mix.  In live sound reinforcement, this is useful for stage monitor mixes where changes in the Front of House channel levels would distract the musicians.  In recording and post production, configuring a send to be pre-fader allows the amount of audio sent to the aux bus to remain unaffected by the individual track fader, thus not disturbing the stability of the feed that is being sent to the musicians. If a send mix is configured post-fader, then the level sent to the send mix follows changes to the main channel strip fader.  This is useful for reverberation and other signal processor effects. An example of this is when an engineer would like to add some delay to the vocals – the fader can thus be used to adjust the amount of delay added.

Pre-fader listen (PFL), after-fader listen (AFL) 
These functions will be found on a primary monitor function. This pre-fade listen is valuable since it allows one to listen through headphones in order to hear what the pre-faded part sounds like, while the studio loudspeaker is being used to monitor the rest of the program.

Pre-fade listen can also be used for talkback as well as to listen to channels before they have been faded. After-fade listen only gets its information later. The choice of listen or level will depend on the user's interest: either with the quality and/or content of the signal or with the signal's level. PFL takes place just before the fader and has a joint channel and monitoring function. PFL sends the channel's signal path to the pre-fade bus. The bus is picked up in the monitor module and made accessible as a substitute signal that is sent to the mixer output. Automatic PFL has been made available, almost universally, and no longer needs to be selected beforehand.

Pre-fade listen can also be incorporated in radio stations and serves as a vital tool. This function allows the radio presenter to listen to the source before it is faded on air; allowing the presenter to check the source's incoming level and make sure it is accurate. It is also valuable since live radio broadcasts can fall apart without it as they will not be able to monitor the sound. After-fader listen is not as useful in live programs.

See also 
 Beatmatching
 Beatmixing
 Gapless playback
 Harmonic mixing

References 

Audio mixing
Audio engineering
Sound recording
DJing
Articles containing video clips